Australian singer and songwriter Jessica Mauboy has released four studio albums, one live album, three soundtrack albums (including two individual soundtracks), one extended play, and thirty seven singles (including two as featured artist). Mauboy was the runner-up on the fourth season of Australian Idol in 2006, and subsequently signed a contract with Sony Music Australia. She released her debut live album The Journey in February 2007, which features songs she performed as part of the top twelve on Australian Idol. The album debuted at number four on the ARIA Albums Chart and was certified gold by the Australian Recording Industry Association (ARIA), denoting shipments of 35,000 copies. Mauboy briefly became a member of the Australian pop girl group Young Divas later that year, before resuming her solo career early in 2008.

Mauboy released her debut studio album Been Waiting in November 2008, which peaked at number eleven on the ARIA Albums Chart and spent fifty-nine weeks in the top fifty. The album was certified double platinum, denoting shipments of 140,000 copies, and became the second highest-selling Australian album of 2009. The album was preceded by the lead single "Running Back", which features American rapper Flo Rida. The song peaked at number three on the ARIA Singles Chart and was certified double platinum. The second single "Burn" became Mauboy's first number-one song on the chart and was certified platinum. It also became Mauboy's first charting single internationally, reaching number 92 on the Japan Hot 100. Been Waiting also yielded three other successful singles which were certified gold, the title track "Been Waiting", "Because" and "Up/Down".

Mauboy's second studio album Get 'Em Girls was released in November 2010, which debuted at number six and was certified gold. As a result, the album was less commercially successful compared to its predecessor. The album's title track "Get 'Em Girls" which features American rapper Snoop Dogg, was released as the lead single and peaked at number nineteen. Subsequent singles "Saturday Night" and "Inescapable" both peaked within the top ten and received double platinum certifications. "Galaxy", the final single from Get 'Em Girls, features Australian recording artist Stan Walker. It became Mauboy's first song to chart in New Zealand, where it reached the top forty and was certified gold by the Recording Industry Association of New Zealand (RIANZ). To promote the film The Sapphires (2012), in which Mauboy portrays the character of Julie McCrae, she released "Gotcha" as the lead single from the soundtrack of the same name. The song peaked at number forty-three on the ARIA Singles Chart.

Mauboy's third studio album Beautiful was released in October 2013, which debuted at number three and was certified platinum. The album was preceded by the lead single "To the End of the Earth", which peaked at number twenty-one and was certified gold. The following singles "Pop a Bottle (Fill Me Up)", "Never Be the Same" and "Can I Get a Moment?" all peaked within the top ten.

Albums

Studio albums

Live albums

Soundtrack albums

Extended plays

Singles

Singles as featured artist

Promotional singles

See also
Jessica Mauboy videography
List of songs recorded by Jessica Mauboy

Notes

References

External links
 
 [ Jessica Mauboy] at AllMusic
 

Discography
Discographies of Australian artists
Rhythm and blues discographies
Pop music discographies